"Donna" is the first single by British art pop band 10cc. Released in 1972, it peaked at No. 2 on the UK Singles Chart. The song was written by Lol Creme and Kevin Godley.

Overview
"Donna", a parody of doo-wop songs (see also "Donna" by Ritchie Valens), was originally written as a potential B-side to the song "Waterfall". The song features sharp contrasts between falsetto in the chorus (Creme) and deep monotone vocals (Godley) in the verse. The melody line is similar to the Beatles song "Oh! Darling".

Band member Eric Stewart has said: "We knew it had something. We only knew of one person who was mad enough to release it, and that was Jonathan King." The song was subsequently released on King's UK Records label. The band had considered releasing it under the name of "Doctor Father Part Two", resurrecting a band name they had used for their 1970 song "Umbopo". Band manager Harvey Lisberg said there was "a vague sort of plan at that time to keep on bringing out records under different names until they got a hit".

Chart performance

Weekly charts

Year-end charts

References

1972 debut singles
10cc songs
Mercury Records singles
Songs written by Kevin Godley
Songs written by Lol Creme
1972 songs
Comedy rock songs
UK Records singles